The National Centre for the Performing Arts (NCPA) is a multi-venue, multi-purpose cultural centre in Mumbai, India, which aims to promote and preserve India's heritage of music, dance, theatre, film, literature and photography. It also presents new and innovative work in the performing arts field.

The centre was founded in 1969 by JRD Tata and Dr. Jamshed Bhabha, (brother of nuclear physicist Homi Jehangir Bhabha).

The NCPA is also the home of the Symphony Orchestra of India, which was established by NCPA in 2006. In 2010 the orchestra performed Beethoven's 9th Symphony in Moscow at the 5th World Symphony Orchestra Festival - the first time an orchestra from India had performed there.

On 29 December 2018 NCPA entered its golden jubilee year. It is to undergo renovations to improve the acoustics and overall experience in 2019.

Principal aims and objectives

 To establish a national centre for the preservation and promotion of classical, traditional and contemporary performing and visual arts.
 To establish, equip and maintain schools, auditoria, libraries, archives, museums, studios, workshops and other facilities necessary to fulfil the above objectives.
 To disseminate knowledge, promote appreciation, provide training and sponsor or undertake scientific research in these fields with the objective of further development by encouragement of innovation within India and by interaction with the arts of other countries.

Theatres

It has 5 theatres in its premise, each catering to a unique genre of performing arts

Jamshed Bhabha Theatre, From large format orchestras to full-scale operas, the most technically complex performances can be staged at this Proscenium theatre with a seating capacity of 1,109. Named after the founder, and operational since 1999, its technical facilities allow for international productions of opera, ballet and major musicals.

This well-equipped, elegant theatre also boasts of a historic marble staircase and a dazzling double-level foyer. The entire staircase was transplanted from another location; more as an art object or architectural folly. It is, undoubtedly, the cornerstone for theatrical extravaganzas staged in South Asia.

Tata Theatre, This distinctive space that can seat 1,010 is the best of both worlds. It effortlessly combines the intimate ambience of a small-scale venue with the splendour of a full scale arena. A revolving stage, brilliant acoustics and a foyer with a scenic view of the sea are just some of the things that make the Tata Theatre the venue of choice for both, performers and audiences. Created by the renowned American Modernist architect Philip Johnson (concept part) Rustom Patell-Patell Batliwala & Associates principal designer and the legendary acoustician Cyril Harris, this theatre opened in 1982. Today, it is Mumbai's preferred venue for Indian classical concerts, Western chamber music and theatre.

Experimental Theatre, As flexible as its name, this theatre opened in 1986 and has 300 movable seats which allow it to be configured to suit a range of events. Its unique 'black box' auditorium is the perfect platform for innovative theatre productions as well as small-scale dance and music performances. It also doubles up as a teaching and workshop space.

Godrej Dance Theatre (funded by Pirojsha Godrej Foundation) is a small theatre was inaugurated in 1987, with a capacity of 200. Its small size allows everyone in the audience to have an intimate experience and appreciate dance up close.

Little Theatre was inaugurated in 1975, and is a smaller venue, seating only 114. It is mainly used to nurture and promote new talent, such as poets, dancers and musicians. It is also used for film screenings.

Other facilities

 Piramal Art Gallery
 Reading and listening libraries
 Studio for archival documentation of dance, drama and music
 Teaching and research block
 Computerised music research laboratory
 Audio-visual archival vault with over 4,000 hours of recording and theatre research material, and a computerised databank for easy retrieval

Performances

Throughout the years NCPA hosted many performances including classical, traditional and contemporary performing arts in dance, theatre, and music. Notable Indian performers who performed at NCPA include Vilayat Khan, M. S. Subbulakshmi, Birju Maharaj, Kelucharan Mohapatra, Savitha Sastry, Mani Madhava Chakyar, Shakuntala, Smita Patil, Parveen Sultana and Shabana Azmi.

NCPA has also attracted many international performers including Yehudi Menuhin, Israel Philharmonic Orchestra, Navoi Bolshoi Ballet of Uzbekistan, Marcel Marceau, Barber of Seville opera, production of Jane Eyre, and other British Council commissioned theatre productions. In 2006, New Jersey Ballet staged India's first full-length classical ballet with its Nutcracker production. In 2016, NCPA in association with Shapoorji Pallonji Group, co-produced Mughal-e-Azam, a Broadway-style musical based on the 1960 Bollywood film Mughal-e-Azam, which was directed by K. Asif and produced by Shapoorji Pallonji.

History 
The NCPA was registered as a public trust in June 1966 as the 'National Institute of Performing Arts' and the current name was adopted in November 1967. It was inaugurated by the then Prime Minister of India Mrs. Indira Gandhi on 29 December 1969 with the performance being held at a rented premise courtesy of the Bhulabhai and Dhirajl Desai Memorial Trust.

Work on the center as it stands today at the tip of Nariman Point, in South Mumbai, began in 1973 on reclaimed land.

See also

 Tata Theatre
 Jamshed Bhabha Theatre

References

External links 
National Centre for the Performing Arts (NCPA), Mumbai, website

Buildings and structures in Mumbai
Culture of Mumbai
Arts organizations established in 1986
Organisations based in Mumbai
Performing arts in India
Tourist attractions in Mumbai
Performing arts centres
1986 establishments in Maharashtra
Performing arts venues in India